Sir William Constable, 1st Baronet (baptized 1590 – 15 June 1655) was an English soldier, politician and regicide, who supported the Parliamentary cause during the English Civil War and interregnum.

Life
Constable was the first son of Sir Robert Constable, who owned estates in Flamborough and Holme in Yorkshire. Little is known about Constable's early life. In 1608, Constable married the daughter of Lord Fairfax and hence received the title baronet from James I in 1611.

After James's death in 1625, Constable found an ally in Sir Thomas Wentworth, the future Earl of Stafford. Through Wentworth's appointment as High Sheriff of Yorkshire, Constable was elected Member of Parliament for Yorkshire in 1626, and then of Scarborough in 1628, serving until 1629. Wentworth appointed him his deputy-lieutenant in 1629.

In 1630 Constable fell into considerable debt, and was forced to sell his estates, with plans to move to New England. This fell through, and Constable and his wife moved to the Netherlands. It was here Constable became involved in the Puritans, led by Philip Nye and Thomas Goodwin. Constable returned to England in 1641 and, with the support of his brother-in-law Lord Ferdinando Fairfax, was elected MP for Knaresborough, Yorkshire. Constable raised an infantry against the Royalist faction in 1642, and fought at Edgehill. In 1643 he commanded under the Fairfaxes at East Riding in Yorkshire. Although he resigned his commission under the Self-Defying Ordinance in 1645, he remained an active independent parliamentarian. He did, however, return to the army and took control of John Lambert's foot regiment. In 1648, he sided with Colonel Hammond in guarding the King (Charles I) at Carisbrooke Castle on the Isle of Wight.

From 1648, he sat on the Army Council in the events leading up to the King's treason trial, and sat as a commissioner of the High Court of Justice during the trial itself, and signed the King's death warrant. After the King had been executed at the Banqueting House, Whitehall, he sat on the Council of State and attended many parliamentary committees concerned with military matters. in 1653 he was High Sheriff of Yorkshire.

Constable died in June 1655, during the Commonwealth, received a State funeral and was buried in Westminster Abbey. After the restoration of the Monarchy in 1660, his body was exhumed from the abbey and re-interred in a communal burial pit in St Margaret's Churchyard, Westminster.

References

David Scott, ‘Constable, Sir William, baronet (bap. 1590, d. 1655)’, Oxford Dictionary of National Biography, Oxford University Press, 2004

External links

 

 
 

1590 births
1655 deaths
Baronets in the Baronetage of England
Regicides of Charles I
People from Flamborough
High Sheriffs of Yorkshire
Burials at St Margaret's, Westminster
Members of the Parliament of England for constituencies in Yorkshire
17th-century soldiers
English MPs 1626
English MPs 1628–1629
English MPs 1640–1648
Members of the Parliament of England for Callington
Military personnel from Yorkshire